Dan T. Carter is an American historian.

Life
Carter graduated from University of South Carolina, University of Wisconsin, and University of North Carolina at Chapel Hill, with a Ph.D. in 1967.
He taught at the University of Maryland, and the University of Wisconsin.
He was Kenan University Professor at Emory University, and Educational Foundation Professor at University of South Carolina, retiring in 2007.
In 2009, he was the Dow Research Professor at the Roosevelt Center in Middelburg, the Netherlands. He was president of the Southern Historical Association.

In his 1991 article for The New York Times, "The Transformation of a Klansman", regarding the true identity of author Asa Earl Carter (who wrote as Forrest Carter), Carter suggested that their shared Southern heritage might make the two men distant cousins; this suggestion has subsequently been put forward as fact in later publications.

Awards
 1970 Bancroft Prize
 1986 Avery O. Craven Award

Works
"Part 1: What Would Mr. Gingrich Have Said?", The Journal for Multi-Media History, 1999

Forewords

References

External links
"The Solid South?", NOW, PBS, 1.30.04
"Invisible Legacy", Emory Magazine,  John D. Thomas, Spring 1996

Stuart A. Rose Manuscript, Archives, and Rare Books Library

University of South Carolina alumni
University of Wisconsin–Madison alumni
University of North Carolina at Chapel Hill alumni
University of Maryland, College Park faculty
University of Wisconsin–Madison faculty
Emory University faculty
University of South Carolina faculty
Living people
21st-century American historians
21st-century American male writers
Historians of race relations
Year of birth missing (living people)
Bancroft Prize winners
American male non-fiction writers